David Kelly (11 July 1929 – 12 February 2012) was an Irish actor who had regular roles in several film and television works from the 1950s onwards. One of the most recognisable voices and faces of Irish stage and screen, Kelly was known for his roles as Rashers Tierney in Strumpet City, Cousin Enda in Me Mammy, the builder Mr O'Reilly in Fawlty Towers, Albert Riddle in Robin's Nest, and Grandpa Joe in the film Charlie and the Chocolate Factory (2005). Another notable role was as Michael O'Sullivan in Waking Ned.

Early life and career
Kelly was born 11 July 1929 in Dublin, Ireland, and educated at Dublin's Synge Street CBS Christian Brothers school. He began acting at the age of eight at the city's Gaiety Theatre, encouraged by a teacher at school he also performed with the Rathmines and Rathgar Musical Society and went on to train at The Abbey School of Acting. 

As a backup career, he additionally trained as a draughtsman and calligrapher, and also learned watercolour art. He appeared onstage in the original production of Brendan Behan's The Quare Fellow, and gained his first major career attention in Samuel Beckett's Krapp's Last Tape at the Dublin's Abbey Theatre in 1959. By then he had made his screen debut in a small part in director John Pomeroy's 1958 film noir Dublin Nightmare.

One of his first television appearances was on RTÉ in O'Dea's your Man (1964) in which he played the part of Ignatius opposite Jimmy O'Dea. He went on to become a familiar face on British television with the BBC comedy Me Mammy, opposite Milo O'Shea and Anna Manahan.  He went on to often-memorable guest roles on such series as Oh Father! and Never Mind the Quality, Feel the Width, and particularly during the 1970s with a long-running role as the one-armed dishwasher Albert Riddle in the Man About the House spin-off Robin's Nest. He also had a regular long running role alongside Bruce Forsyth in both series of the comedy Slinger's Day from 1986 to 1987, and, in 1991, he appeared in the first series of the BBC sitcom 2point4 Children as the cafe-owner Paddy.

He gained some of his greatest recognition in 1975, playing inept builder Mr O'Reilly on the second episode of Fawlty Towers ("The Builders").

Kelly was in the voice cast of The Light Princess, a partly animated, hour-long family fantasy that aired on the BBC in 1978.

In Ireland, he may be most famous for his portrayal of the character "Rashers" Tierney in the 1980 RTÉ miniseries Strumpet City, which starred Peter O'Toole, Cyril Cusack and Peter Ustinov. He went on to have starring roles in television shows such as Emmerdale Farm in the 1980s and Glenroe in the 1990s, as well as playing the grandfather in Mike Newell's film Into the West (1992).

Following his appearance as Michael O'Sullivan in the 1998 film Waking Ned, he played roles in such films as Tim Burton's Charlie and the Chocolate Factory (2005), in which he played Grandpa Joe, and Agent Cody Banks 2: Destination London (2004). He played title character Frank Kovak in the mystery film The Kovak Box, in a rare villainous role. In 2007, he appeared in Stardust, which featured Robert De Niro and Michelle Pfeiffer, and which was also his final film. He also did extensive radio work, including a guest appearance on the BBC Radio 4 series Baldi.

Later life and death
Kelly was married to actress Laurie Morton, who survived him, along with children David and Miriam. He died after a short illness on 12 February 2012 at age 82.  The Irish Times referred to him as the "grand old man of Irish acting". A Catholic funeral mass took place on 16 February 2012, at the Church of the Miraculous Medal, in the actor's home town of Dublin. Kelly was cremated at Mount Jerome Cemetery and Crematorium.

Awards and honours
Kelly won a 1991 Helen Hayes Award for Outstanding Supporting Performer, Non-Resident Production, for a Kennedy Center revival of The Playboy of the Western World. As well, he earned a Screen Actors Guild Award nomination for the 1998 film Waking Ned.

In 2005, Kelly won the Irish Film & Television Academy's Lifetime Achievement Award, in addition to earning a nomination for Best Supporting Actor for the film Charlie and the Chocolate Factory.

Filmography and television

The Wrong Man (1956) – Policeman (uncredited)
Dublin Nightmare (1958) – 1st Customer
The Quare Fellow (1962) – Reception Clerk
Girl with Green Eyes (1964) – ticket collector
Young Cassidy (1965) – O'Brien
Ulysses (1967) – Garrett Deasy
Me Mammy (1968–71) – Cousin Enda 
The Italian Job (1969) – Vicar (funeral scene)
Quackser Fortune Has a Cousin in the Bronx (1970) – Tom Maguire
The McKenzie Break (1970) – Adjutant (uncredited)
Tales From the Lazy Acre (1972) – Dead Man
Never Mind the Quality, Feel the Width (1973) – Murphy
Fawlty Towers (1975) – O'Reilly (episode "The Builders")
Philadelphia, Here I Come (1975) – Canon O'Byrne
The Next Man (1976) – Chauffeur in Ireland
The Purple Taxi (1977) – Little Person
A Portrait of the Artist as a Young Man (1977) – Dean of Studies
Citizen Smith (1978) – Paddy
Robin's Nest (1977–1981) – Albert Riddle
Cowboys (1980–1981) – Wobbly Ron
Strumpet City (1980) – Rashers Tierney
Whoops Apocalypse (1982) – Abdab
The Hunchback of Notre Dame (1982) – Tavernkeeper
The Jigsaw Man (1983) – Cameron
Red Monarch (1983) – Sergo
Glenroe (1983) – Sylvie Dolan
Anne Devlin (1984) – Dr. Trevor
Stryker's War (1985)
Slinger's Day (1986) – Fred
Pirates (1986) – Ship's Surgeon
Joyriders (1988) – Daniel
Into the West (1992) – Grandfather Reilly
Tales of the Tooth Fairies (1992) – Arthur (voice)
A Man of No Importance (1994) – Christy Ward
Moondance (1994) – Mr Dunwoody
The Run of the Country (1995) – Father Gaynor
Upwardly Mobile (1995–1997) – Barman
The Matchmaker  (1997) – O'Connor
 Heartbeat (1997) Pa Deighton Waking Ned (1998) – Michael O'SullivanBallykissangel (1998) – Mr O'ReillyOrdinary Decent Criminal (2000) – Fr GroganGreenfingers (2000) – Fergus WilksRough for Theatre I (2000) – AMean Machine (2001) – DocPuckoon (2002) – O'TooleMystics (2003) – DaveAgent Cody Banks 2: Destination London (2004) – TrivalLaws of Attraction (2004) – Priest / MichaelThe Calcium Kid (2004) – Paddy O'FlannaganCharlie and the Chocolate Factory (2005) – Grandpa JoeThe Kovak Box (2006) – Frank KovakConversations with God (2006) – Job Interviewer Who's Your Caddy? (2007) – Robert "Bobby" HawkinsStardust'' (2007) – Guard at The Wall

References

External links
 
 
 

1929 births
2012 deaths
20th-century Irish male actors
21st-century Irish male actors
Burials at Mount Jerome Cemetery and Crematorium
Disease-related deaths in the Republic of Ireland
Irish male film actors
Irish male radio actors
Irish male soap opera actors
Irish male stage actors
Irish male television actors
Male actors from Dublin (city)
People educated at Synge Street CBS